The Swiss National Park is located in the Western Rhaetian Alps, in eastern Switzerland. It is within the canton of Graubünden, between Zernez, S-chanf, Scuol, and the Fuorn Pass in the Engadin valley on the border with Italy.

It is part of the worldwide UNESCO Biosphere Reserve.

Description 

It was founded on 1 August 1914, the national holiday of Switzerland. It was one of the earliest national parks in Europe.

As of 2022, it is the only National Park in Switzerland, though there are plans to create more. It has an area of 174.2 km² and is the largest protected area of the country.

In the park, it's not allowed to leave marked paths; light a fire; or sleep outside the Chamanna Cluozza, the mountain hut located in the park. It is also forbidden to disturb animals or plants, or to take home anything found in the park. Dogs are not allowed, even on a leash. Due to these strict rules, the Swiss National Park is the only park in the Alps which has been categorized by the IUCN as a strict nature reserve, the highest protection level.

A visitor centre is located in Zernez. The road through the park leads over the Fuorn Pass (or Ofenpass) to South Tyrol in Italy.

In addition to the Swiss National Park, Switzerland also has sixteen regional nature parks.

Notable peaks
Piz Pisoc, 3173 m.
Piz Quattervals, 3165 m.
Piz da l'Acqua, 3126 m.
Piz Chaschauna, 3071 m.

Gallery

See also
 Nature parks in Switzerland
 Pro Natura
 List of national parks

References

External links

 Official website
 Swiss National Park Facts
 
 

National parks of Switzerland
Biosphere reserves of Switzerland
Rhaetian Alps
Geography of Graubünden
1914 establishments in Switzerland
Protected areas established in 1914
Tourist attractions in Graubünden
Protected areas of the Alps
S-chanf
Scuol
Val Müstair
Zernez